Cameron Carr may refer to:

 Cameron Carr (actor) (1876–1944), British actor of the silent era
 Cameron Carr (wheelchair rugby) (born 1977), Australian Paralympic wheelchair rugby player